OAG, also spelled O@G, also known as Old Automatic Garbage or Orang Asia Genius (Genius Asians), is a Malaysian pop and alternative rock band. The band, formed in 1992, was one of the first English language alternative rock bands in Malaysia to get huge attention from mainstream music listeners. The current line-up of the band are Muhammad Radhi Razali (vocals) after Qi Razali (drums) left the group in early 2023  following by Nazrin Zabidi (bass guitar) and Ammal (lead guitar).

The band is well known for breaking the mainstream mold of Malay rock and pop at that time, pushing the alternative genre and underground spirit into commercial media such as radio and television. The 60's TV videoclip was a landmark success in a new direction of music video for the country, and becomes one of the most recognisable songs ever in indie/underground circuits (next to Butterfingers' Nicotine and Vio-Pipe).

History

1994–1999: Debut, 67 EP and Melody Mocker
The original line-up of the band were Radhi, Qi(drums), Mohd Azrie Hadi aka Ayie( guitar), Ivan (lead guitar) and Lam (bass guitar).  Ivan and Lam however returned to their studies in 1996, with them being replaced ter by Edmund Boey (bass guitar) and Adin (lead guitar) in 1996. Radhi, Qi, Edmund and Adin have been arguably dubbed 'the Classic OAG line-up' by many. Their big break came when Paul Moss, the producer from Positive Tone at that time heard their music and wanted them to send a new demo. OAG quickly recorded their demos within a few weeks (some say within a week) to submit it to Paul. Paul was impressed with the tape and signed the band up under Positive Tone. Gradually the band picked up a respectable number of fans in the country. They went on to win the Best New Artist category in the Anugerah Industri Muzik in 1996 and their first videoclip, directed by Brad Hogarth, 60's TV, was also nominated for the Best Video Clip category. They released an EP titled 67 which contained six songs.

When Positive Tone released OAG's Old Automatic Garbage album in December 1994, no one was expecting that the group of four teenage boys who describe their music as "60s Crunchy Pop Fuzz" would open a new chapter in local English music. The 11-song album backed by the national hit '60s TV' not only became the biggest ever English hit, it opened the doors for more appreciation towards home-made English music that would otherwise still be considered as "underground" if not second class. Old Automatic Garbage went triple-platinum and helped spark off the commercialisation of alternative music into mainstream Malaysia.

In 1997, the band wrote and performed the official theme to the 1997 FIFA World Youth Championship, which was also released in 8 European countries. They also participated in a landmark alternative compilation album called Boys & Girls 1+1=3 which introduced other groups like Nice Stupid Playground, IntoXicated, Brodwyn ( later renamed Juliet The Orange ) and a solo act Nita. "Boys & Girls 1+1=3" went platinum. In 1997, OAG released EP 67, an EP that went gold in 3 days. The EP was a landmark and a wonderful experimentation between alternative and dance music. OAG then released Melody Mocker in 1999. The album included a groundbreaking CD-ROM section where fans can not only view the various lyrics, artwork and interviews of the group; but also re-mix certain samples out of the band's songs. The CD made it to the 1999 PIKOM-Computimes Finals in the CD-ROM category and also managed to gain a GOLD sales award.

2000–2004: Opera Radhi-o Friendly and Satelit Ink
Around the year 2000, OAG began making music in the Malay language. Their debut Malay album, Opera Radhi-o Friendly which also includes an English song and a Sarawakian Malay song, was released in 2002. Their single from the album, Slumber, went top of local charts. A year later, they released their second Malay album, Satelit Ink. before they split up. Satelit Ink became regarded by the public due to its high level of songwriting and music production, confirming OAG's status as a credible yet commercial indie pop outfit. In 2004, eight years after the "60s TV" debut, OAG released Opera Radhi-o Friendly. This time around OAG set their eyes on a bigger goal than just to conquer the English-listening crowd: they expanded their horizons by trying to attract the Malay-listening crowd. Opera Radhi-o Friendly sold over 20,000 units, helped by their animated music video for "Slumber", a song that climbed to the 1 spot on Era FM's Carta Era.

At the meantime, Naza and Alim and Mon would eventually leave OAg after Satelit Ink'''s production to form rival band The Times while Radhi shopped around to recruit a new line up to replace them. OAG now consists of Radhi on vocals, Fizul and Nizam on guitars, Eric on bass and Zul who still remains on drums.

2005–2011: OrAnG, temporary hiatus
OAG came back with a new line-up in 2005. Radhi, as the founder of OAG, together with Hafizul Azim, Muhamad Nizam, Azeezul Fitri and Eric Wong, recorded an album, OrAnG which was released in 2006. In July 2007, OAG won the group category in the Ikon Malaysia competition, a competition which features established artistes in Malaysia. The band, together with Jaclyn Victor, the winner of the solo category, went on to represent Malaysia in the regional IKON ASEAN in August 2007, where they did not win.

A year later they released a single entitled Merdayka. The patriotically-themed song, which debuted live on the Ikon Malaysia a year earlier is the last song they recorded before OAG going on hiatus in 2009. While Radhi went solo and released a single Infiniti using the stage name Radhi-O; the rest of the band members set a new band called OrAnG named after their 2006 album. No new materials were released by OrAnG however. Meanwhile, Radhi had attained nationwide infamy due to his unstable marriage and struggle with drug addiction, though he had recovered from the latter since then.

2012–2013
In 2012, Radhi recruited new 'musicians' for OAG, who were selected from among the students of Akademi Seni Budaya dan Warisan Kebangsaan. The new line-up consists of Azzam (drums), Muhamad Nizam (guitar - since 2005), Nazrin Zabidi (bass guitar/backing vocals), and Izmer Khasbullah (keyboard/backing vocals). Radhi defines OAG's new music as aslinatif, a combination of muzik asli or traditional music and alternative. Shortly after their reunion, they released the soundtrack and theme song to the TV series, Friday I'm in Love. Few other singles like Si Pengasih Muda and Di Bawah Tanah Ayer''.

2014–present
In 2014, OAG appeared with several new experts. Among them is the re-emergence of OAG's original drummer Qi Razali. Radhi as the leader of the group maintains Nizam Norani (guitar) and Nazrin (bass guitar). Radhi hired a new guitarist in 2017, Ammal. OAG then released the English Single titled Snowball in 2017 and Infiniti released in late 2018.
Although long established in the Malaysian music industry, the OAG Band is still relevant and still widely accepted.

On December 25, 2022, the band performed a 30th anniversary concert. The next month, on January 13, Qi Razali announced his departure from the band, leaving Radhi the band's last remaining founding member. On January 26, Ammal announced his own departure.

Discography

References

External links
OAG official website
More information from espnstar.com
Profile from IKON Malaysia

Malaysian rock music groups
Malaysian alternative rock groups
Musical groups established in 1992
Malaysian indie rock groups